Brave Entertainment (also known as Brave Sound Entertainment) is a South Korean entertainment company founded in 2008 by Brave Brothers.

Company
Brave Entertainment was founded in 2008 by Kang Dong Chul, known by his stage name Brave Brothers, after he left YG Entertainment. Brave Entertainment's Brave Brothers has collaborated with Starship Entertainment when it was revealed that he produced Sistar's debut song "Push Push", and has been producing songs for them, including their hit song, "So Cool" and "Alone".

Artists

Recording artists
Groups
 DKB
Producers
 Brave Brothers
 Maboos (마부스)
 Chakun (차쿤)
 JS
 2CHAMP
 RedCookie (레드쿠키)

Former artists

Former recording artists
 1Punch (2015)
One (2015)
Samuel (2015–2021)
Elephant Kingdom (20??–2016)
 Brave Girls (2011–2023)
 Park Eunyoung (2011–2013)
 Park SeoA (2011–2013)
 Han Yejin (2011–2013)
 Jung Yoo-jin (2011–2017)
 Noh Hye-ran (2011–2019)
 Lee Ha-yun (2015–2019)
 Kim Min-young (2015–2023)
 Nam Yu-jeong (2015–2023)
 Hong Eun-ji (2015–2023)
 Lee Yu-na (2015–2023)
 Big Star (2012–2019)
 Electroboyz
 Cherrsee
 Park Soo-jin

Former actors/actresses
 Kim Sa-rang
 Jung Man-sik
 Oh Kwang-Seok (Big Star's FeelDog)

References

External links
Official website

 
Record labels established in 2008
South Korean record labels
Talent agencies of South Korea
K-pop record labels
Contemporary R&B record labels
Hip hop record labels
Labels distributed by Kakao M